The black-hooded laughingthrush (Garrulax milleti) is a species of bird in the family Leiothrichidae.
It is found in Laos and Vietnam.
Its natural habitats are subtropical or tropical moist lowland forests and subtropical or tropical moist montane forests.
It is threatened by habitat loss.

References

black-hooded laughingthrush
Birds of Laos
Birds of Vietnam
black-hooded laughingthrush
Taxonomy articles created by Polbot